Artoon Co., Ltd. (株式会社アートゥーン Kabushiki-Gaisha Ātūn) was a Japanese video game developer established in 1999. It became a subsidiary of AQ Interactive in May 2004 and became a wholly owned subsidiary in June 2005. The team was primarily affiliated in the United States with Microsoft Xbox and Xbox 360 projects, although they had also worked with Hudson Soft and Nintendo on other platforms.

Key Artoon personnel include Yoji Ishii, Manabu Kusunoki, Hidetoshi Takeshita, Yutaka Sugano, Masamichi Harada, Takuya Matsumoto and Naoto Ohshima. When the company formed, it drew personnel and talent from several of Sega's development teams, particularly those which worked on Sonic the Hedgehog (created by Ōshima), and Panzer Dragoon.  The developer had approximately 85 employees. The company's focus was to create original game content for various consoles. Artoon became defunct when the parent company, AQ Interactive, filed for bankruptcy.

Artoon was situated in Yokohama, Kanagawa prefecture, Japan. A secondary studio was maintained in Naha, Okinawa prefecture, Japan.

Artoon, along with feelplus and Cavia, were all absorbed into parent company AQ Interactive.

Games developed

References

Defunct video game companies of Japan
Video game companies established in 1999
Video game companies disestablished in 2010
Video game development companies
Japanese companies established in 1999
Japanese companies disestablished in 2010
AQ Interactive